The Carmier-Arnoux Simplex was a tailless racing aircraft built in France in the early 1920s.

Design
The Arnoux Simplex was a cantilever monoplane with full-span controllers. The fuselage ended with a vertical fin with a rudder, but no horizontal stabilizer. The pilot sat far back behind the wing's leading edge.

Specifications (Simplex)

References

Bibliography

Tailless aircraft
1920s French aircraft